Knox College may refer to:
Knox College (Illinois), a four-year coeducational private liberal arts college in Galesburg, Illinois, US
Knox College, Otago, a hall of residence and school of ministry at the University of Otago, Dunedin, New Zealand
Knox College, University of Toronto, a Toronto School of Theology (TST) and University of Toronto affiliated theological college in Toronto, Canada
Knox College, Jamaica, a Junior School, High School, and Community College in Spaldings, Jamaica

See also
Knox Academy, secondary school in Haddington, Scotland
Knox Grammar School, in Sydney, Australia